Kathy Lie (born 14 March 1964) is a Norwegian nurse and politician.

Following the 2019 Norwegian local election, she became deputy county mayor of the newly established Viken county. She resigned from this position when she was elected to the Storting. She was succeeded by fellow party member, Camilla Sørensen Eidsvold.

She was elected representative to the Storting from the constituency of Buskerud for the period 2021–2025, for the Socialist Left Party.

Lie hails from Lier, and is a nurse by education.

References

1964 births
Living people
Socialist Left Party (Norway) politicians
Buskerud politicians
Members of the Storting
Women members of the Storting